Eric Illayapparachchi (born 16 December 1954) is a Sinhalese writer and poet. He wrote the libretto for Agni, an opera composed by Premasiri Khemadasa which had its premiere on 26 May 2007 in Colombo. One of his short stories was made into a television drama for the series Vinividimi Adura (Through the Darkness) on Sri Lanka's ITN network. Another of his short stories appears in an anthology of Sri Lankan stories in English translation (Ashley Helpe (ed.), A Lankan Mosaic, Three Wheeler Press).

Books

See also
 Sri Lankan literature

Sources
Ajith Samaranayake, "The dark face of the new left", Sunday Observer (Sri Lanka), 23 January 2005.
 Aravinda, "Caliban's mirror ", Daily News (Sri Lanka), 3 October 2001.
Chamikara Weerasinghe, "Fire on stage in opera", The Daily News (Sri Lanka), 25 May 2007.
Susitha R. Fernando, 'Vinividimi Andura' To enlighten Lankan teledrama, The Sunday Times (Sri Lanka), 18 February 2007. 
K. S. Sivakumaran, "A Lankan mosaic", The Daily News (Sri Lanka), 31 December 2003.
Malini Govinnage, "Memorable literary discourses" (review of Sahitha Samaja Prathiroopa by  Sashi Prabhath Ranasinghe, profiles of 20 prominent literary figures in Sri Lanka, including Eric Illayapparachchi), The Daily News (Sri Lanka), 30 June 2004.

External links
"Sonic canvas of Premasiri Khemadasa" by Eric 
Agni Opera - official web site

1954 births
Living people
Sinhalese poets
Sinhalese writers
Sri Lankan novelists